Chattam is a 2011 Indian Telugu-language action film produced by Natti Kumar & Tummalapalli Rama Satyanarayana on Vishaka Talkies banner and directed by P. A. Arun Prasad. Starring Jagapathi Babu and Vimala Raman with music composed by M. M. Srilekha. The film recorded as flop at box office.

Cast 

 Jagapati Babu as Gauri Shankar
 Vimala Raman as Sindhu
 Ashish Vidyarthi as Shivaji
 Murali Sharma as Sarath Chandra IPS, Superintendent of Police, CB-CID
 Amit Dhawan as Ajmal Kasab
 Chalapathi Rao as Police Commissioner
 Rao Ramesh as Prakash
 Venu Madhav as Badhri
 Amith
 Vijayachander
 Prasad Babu
 Kondavalasa as "Youth Star" Rahul
 Jeeva as Ranga Rao
 Raghava
 Gundu Hanumantha Rao
 Gundu Sudarshan 
 Duvvasi Mohan 
 Junior Relangi
 Asha Saini as item number
 Siva Parvathi
 Meena
 Geetha Singh

Soundtrack 

The Music and Background score was composed by M. M. Srilekha.

References

External links
 

2011 films
Fictional portrayals of the Andhra Pradesh Police
Films about terrorism in India
Indian films based on actual events
Films shot in Mumbai
2010s Telugu-language films
Films directed by P. A. Arun Prasad
Films scored by M. M. Srilekha